Ll/ll is a digraph that occurs in several languages.

English
In English,  often represents the same sound as single : . The doubling is used to indicate that the preceding vowel is (historically) short, or that the "l" sound is to be extended longer than a single  would provide (etymologically, in latinisms coming from a gemination). See also: American and British English spelling differences#Doubled consonants.

Welsh

In Welsh,  stands for a voiceless alveolar lateral fricative sound.

In modern Welsh this, and other digraph letters, are written with two symbols but count as one letter. This ligature is seldom used in Modern Welsh, but equivalent ligatures may be included in modern fonts, for example the three fonts commissioned by the Welsh Government in 2020.

Romance languages

Catalan

L with middle dot
For example  ("excellent").

Galician
In official Galician spelling the  combination stands for the phoneme  (palatal lateral approximant, a palatal counterpart of ).

Spanish

In Spanish,  was considered from 1754 to 2010 the fourteenth letter of the Spanish alphabet because of its representation of a palatal lateral articulation consonant phoneme (as defined by the Royal Academy of the Spanish Language).
 This single letter was called  pronounced "elye", but often losing the /l/ sound and simplifying to "eh-ye".
 The letter was collated after  as a separate entry from 1803 until April 1994 when the X Congress of the Association of Spanish Language Academies adopted standard Latin alphabet collation rules. Since then, the digraph  has been considered a sequence of two characters. (A similar situation occurred with the Spanish-language digraph ch.)
In handwriting,  is written as a ligature of two s, with distinct uppercase and lowercase forms.

Philippine languages
While Philippine languages like Tagalog and Ilocano write  or  when spelling Spanish loanwords,  still survives in proper nouns. Hence the surnames Llamzon, Llamas, Padilla, Bellen,Basallote and Villanueva are respectively pronounced /,  and /.

Furthermore, in Ilocano  represents a geminate alveolar lateral approximant , like in Italian.

Albanian
In Albanian,  stands for the sound , while  is pronounced as the velarized sound .

Icelandic
The geographical name Eyjafjallajökull includes the  sound twice.

Broken L
It takes the form of a lowercase  with the top half shifted to the left, connected to the lower half with a thin horizontal stroke. This ligature is encoded in the Latin Extended-D Unicode block at U+A746 (uppercase) and U+A747 (lowercase), displaying as Ꝇ and ꝇ respectively.

Inuit-Yupik languages

Other languages

In Haida (Bringhurst orthography),  is glottalized .

See also
 Lh (digraph)
 Lj (digraph)
 Hungarian ly

References

Latin-script digraphs